Donald William "Shanty" MacKenzie, Sr. (c. 1920 – May 2001) was a Canadian football player who played for the Toronto Argonauts. He won the Grey Cup with them in 1950 and 1952. He was a veteran of World War II. MacKenzie was later the building superintendent of Maple Leaf Gardens, a position he held for 40 years. He died in 2001.

References

1920s births
2001 deaths
Toronto Argonauts players